Mansour Al-Thagafi (born 14 January 1979) is a Saudi Arabian former footballer. He last played for Al-Qadisiyah FC.

Al-Thagafi has played most of his career for Al-Nassr.

He played for the Saudi Arabia national football team and was a participant at the 2002 FIFA World Cup.

References

External links

1979 births
Living people
Saudi Arabian footballers
Saudi Arabia international footballers
Association football defenders
Al Nassr FC players
Al-Ahli Saudi FC players
Al-Qadsiah FC players
Saudi Professional League players
2002 FIFA World Cup players